Puerto Rico Highway 121 (PR-121) is a road that travels from Sabana Grande, Puerto Rico to Yauco. This highway begins at its intersection with PR-102 and PR-368 in downtown Sabana Grande and ends at its junction with PR-127 and PR-128 in Susúa Baja.

Major intersections

See also

 List of highways numbered 121

References

External links
 

121